Monochamus shembaganurensis is a species of beetle in the family Cerambycidae. It was described by Stephan von Breuning in 1979.

References

shembaganurensis
Beetles described in 1979